Megachile swarbrecki is a species of bee in the family Megachilidae. It was described by Rayment in 1946.

References

Swarbrecki
Insects described in 1946